The World Meteorological Organization is a specialized agency of the United Nations.

WMO may also refer to:

 Wayanad Muslim Orphanage, Kerala, India
 Wireless Monitoring Organisation, India
 World Mahjong Organization
 World Migration Organization
 World Mime Organisation
 World Muay Thai Organization, see 
 WMO 2015, or Social Support Act 2015, a Dutch law